Michigan's 30th Senate district is one of 38 districts in the Michigan Senate. The 30th district was created by the 1850 Michigan Constitution, as the 1835 constitution only permitted a maximum of eight senate districts. It has been represented by Republican Mark Huizenga since 2023, succeeding fellow Republican Roger Victory. By most measures it is the most Republican-leaning district in the Senate.

Geography
District 30 encompasses parts of Kent and Ottawa counties.

2011 Apportionment Plan
District 30, as dictated by the 2011 Apportionment Plan, was exactly coterminous with Ottawa County in the western suburbs of Grand Rapids, including the communities of Grand Haven, Hudsonville, Coopersville, Zeeland, Ferrysburg, Allendale, Jenison, Georgetown Township, Grand Haven Township, Holland Township, Park Township, Spring Lake Township, Zeeland Township, and most of northern Holland.

The district was located entirely within Michigan's 2nd congressional district, and overlapped with the 88th, 89th, and 90th districts of the Michigan House of Representatives.

List of senators

Recent election results

2018

2014

1998

Federal and statewide results in District 30

Historical district boundaries

References 

30
Ottawa County, Michigan